Patrick O'Madigan Dixon (9 October 1907 – 14 September 1987) was an Irish cricketer. A right-handed batsman, right-arm medium pace and leg-break bowler, he played just once for the Ireland cricket team, a first-class match against Scotland in June 1932.

He also played two first-class matches for Dublin University against Northamptonshire in 1926. His brother Thomas also represented Ireland at cricket.

References

1907 births
1987 deaths
Irish cricketers
Dublin University cricketers
People from Rohtak
Cricketers from Haryana
Irish people in colonial India